Medvedkovo is a rural locality (a village) in Biryakovskoye Rural Settlement, Sokolsky District, Vologda Oblast, Russia. The population was 13 as of 2002.

Geography 
Medvedkovo is located 98 km northeast of Sokol (the district's administrative centre) by road. Semenovo is the nearest rural locality.

References 

Rural localities in Sokolsky District, Vologda Oblast